Quinn Josiah (born 4 May 2000) is an footballer who plays as a goalkeeper for American college Prairie View A&M Lady Panthers. Born in Canada, she plays for the Saint Kitts and Nevis women's national team.

College career
In 2018, she committed to Prairie View A&M University to play for the Prairie View A&M Lady Panthers women's soccer team. In her freshman season, she stated 19 games, including a 20 save performance against the McNeese State Cowgirls on August 17, 2018. In 2019, she was a Second-Team All-SWAC. She won the SWAC title in 2019 and was named to the All-Tournament team. In the spring of 2021, she was named the SWAC Preseason Goalkeeper of the Year, and later earning Goalkeeper of the Week honours in March. She was once again named to the All-Tournament team as the Panthers captured their second SWAC title in three years.

Club career
From 2016 to 2018, she played for Aurora FC in League1 Ontario. She made her debut on May 7, 2016 against Vaughan Azzurri.

In 2019, she appeared in a playoff game with Vaughan Azzurri, keeping a clean sheet in a 6-0 victory over Alliance United FC.

International career
Josiah was named to the  Saint Kitts and Nevis under-20 national team for the 2020 CONCACAF Women's U-20 Championship qualification.

She has also been capped to the senior national team, making her debut in the 2020 CONCACAF Women's Olympic Qualifying Championship on 4 February 2020 against Jamaica.

References

External links
 

2000 births
Living people
Citizens of Saint Kitts and Nevis through descent
Saint Kitts and Nevis women's footballers
Women's association football goalkeepers
Prairie View A&M University alumni
Saint Kitts and Nevis women's international footballers
Saint Kitts and Nevis expatriate women's footballers
Saint Kitts and Nevis expatriate sportspeople in the United States
Expatriate women's soccer players in the United States
Sportspeople from Newmarket, Ontario
Soccer people from Ontario
Canadian women's soccer players
Black Canadian women's soccer players
Canadian people of Saint Kitts and Nevis descent
Sportspeople of Saint Kitts and Nevis descent
Canadian expatriate soccer players
Canadian expatriate sportspeople in the United States
Vaughan Azzurri (women) players
Aurora FC (Canada) players
League1 Ontario (women) players